Blackbeard: Terror at Sea, a television special by the BBC, starring James Purefoy as Blackbeard. It aired in the United States on March 12, 2006 on National Geographic and was released on DVD in the Netherlands in July 2006, by Just Entertainment.

References

External links

Photos of James Purefoy

2006 television films
2006 films
British television films
BBC television dramas
Pirate films
Cultural depictions of Blackbeard